Manuel Prado Perez-Rosas S.J. (26 May 1923 – 9 October 2011) was a Peruvian prelate of the Catholic Church.

Perez-Rosas was born in Lima, Peru.  ordained a Jesuit priest on 13 July 1956. He was appointed bishop of the Diocese of Chachapoyasl on 7 September 1970, and ordained a month later. He was later named Archbishop of the Archdiocese of Trujillo on 29 December 1976. He retired on 29 July 1999.

See also
Society of Jesus

External links
Catholic-Hierarchy

1923 births
2011 deaths
20th-century Roman Catholic archbishops in Peru
Clergy from Lima
Place of death missing
20th-century Peruvian Jesuits
Jesuit archbishops
Roman Catholic archbishops of Trujillo
Roman Catholic bishops of Chachapoyas